Osceola Township is a civil township of Houghton County in the U.S. state of Michigan.  The population was 1,908 at the 2000 census.

Communities
Torch Lake is just to the north. The ZIP code is 49922. Dollar Bay, first settled in 1887, was platted in 1899 as the Village of Clark, but was never incorporated.
Osceola is an unincorporated community in the township.
Tamarack is an unincorporated community in the township.
Tamarack City is an unincorporated community in the township.
Tamarack Mill is an unincorporated community in the township.
Tecumseh is an unincorporated community in the township.
West Tamarack is an unincorporated community in the township.

Geography
According to the United States Census Bureau, the township has a total area of 26.0 square miles (67.3 km), of which 24.8 square miles (64.3 km) is land and 1.1 square miles (3.0 km) (4.39%) is water.

Demographics
As of the census of 2000, there were 1,908 people, 779 households, and 522 families residing in the township. The racial makeup of the township was 98.01% White, 0.10% African American, 0.42% Native American, 0.37% Asian, and 1.10% from two or more races. Hispanic or Latino of any race were 0.58% of the population. 37.7% were of Finnish, 13.8% German, 8.1% French and 7.7% English ancestry according to Census 2000.

There were 779 households, out of which 28.2% had children under the age of 18 living with them, 54.6% were married couples living together, 8.0% had a female householder with no husband present, and 32.9% were non-families. 26.7% of all households were made up of individuals, and 11.9% had someone living alone who was 65 years of age or older.  The average household size was 2.44 and the average family size was 2.98.

In the township the population was spread out, with 25.2% under the age of 18, 7.1% from 18 to 24, 28.3% from 25 to 44, 24.0% from 45 to 64, and 15.4% who were 65 years of age or older.  The median age was 38 years. For every 100 females, there were 102.3 males.  For every 100 females age 18 and over, there were 96.3 males.

The median income for a household in the township was $31,278, and the median income for a family was $39,861. Males had a median income of $28,843 versus $20,898 for females. The per capita income for the township was $15,727.  About 6.9% of families and 11.5% of the population were below the poverty line, including 14.8% of those under age 18 and 14.7% of those age 65 or over.

Notable people
Hunk Anderson, former player and head coach for the Chicago Bears
Russell Hellman, legislator, Michigan House of Representatives, 1961-1980
Chester Marcol, former placekicker for the Green Bay Packers
William Moore, Wisconsin legislator

References

External links
Hunts' Guide to Michigan's Upper Peninsula: Dollar Bay

Townships in Houghton County, Michigan
Houghton micropolitan area, Michigan
Townships in Michigan
1886 establishments in Michigan
Populated places established in 1886